The Hiroshima City Museum of History and Traditional Crafts is a history museum in Ujina-nishi Park in Hiroshima, Japan.

History

Opened as a packing plant of Ujina provisions and fodder plant for Imperial Army in March 1911.
Handed over from a private company to Hiroshima City in 1977.
Repaired the building in 1984.
Opened as the museum in 1985.

Museum

Permanent exhibits
Sadaaki Senda and Ujina Port – started in 1884, completed in 1889
History of the plant building – from 1894 to 1985
Oyster farming – since 1532–1555
Laver farming – since Edo period
Yagi irrigation channel – opened in 1768 by Hiroshima Han
Rice farming
Hemp production – started in the 10th century, peaked in 1919, finished in the 1950s.
Kamoji production – old comb for women – since 1624
Japanese Umbrella production – since 1615, peaked in 1920
Geta (footwear) production – since 1622
Textile production of Antheraea yamamai cocoon
Wooden boat building
Life with the fire

Special exhibitions

Educational programs
Saturday school
Summer school for junior and senior high school students
Special events

Experience room

Publications

Access
Hiroden Ujina 2-chome Station
Hiroshima Bus Miyuki 2-chome or Bay City Ujina bus stop

External links
Explore Hiroshima: Hiroshima City Museum of History and Traditional Crafts
The City of Hiroshima: Hiroshima City Museum of History and Traditional Crafts

Museums established in 1911
Museums established in 1985
Museums in Hiroshima
History museums in Japan
Folk art museums and galleries in Japan
1985 establishments in Japan